Khooni Shikanja is a Hindi horror fantasy film of Bollywood directed by Yeshwant. This film was released in 2000. The music director of Khooni Shikanja was Bappi Lahiri.

Plot
Shankar marries Shefali for her huge properties. Shankar's family members plot to kill their daughter in law. They rape and murder her but Shefali's soul comes out from the grave as a murderous vengeful spirit who kills Shankar's family members one by one.

Cast
 Navin Nischol
 Raza Murad
 Kiran Kumar
 Anil Dhawan
 Dinesh Hingoo
 Isha Gupta
 Hitesh Patel
 Rajender Kaur
 Lekha Govil
 Birbal
 Usha Singh

References

External links
 

2000 films
Indian erotic horror films
2000s Hindi-language films
Films scored by Bappi Lahiri
2000 horror films